The tonne ( or ; symbol: t) is a unit of mass equal to 1000 kilograms. It is a non-SI unit accepted for use with SI. It is also referred to as a metric ton to distinguish it from the non-metric units of the short ton (United States customary units), and the long ton (British imperial units). It is equivalent to approximately 2204.6 pounds, 1.102 short tons, and 0.984 long tons. The official SI unit is the megagram (symbol: Mg), a less common way to express the same mass.

Symbol and abbreviations
The BIPM symbol for the tonne is t, adopted at the same time as the unit in 1879. Its use is also official for the metric ton in the United States, having been adopted by the United States National Institute of Standards and Technology (NIST). It is a symbol, not an abbreviation, and should not be followed by a period. Use of minuscule letter case is significant, and use of other letter combinations can lead to ambiguity. For example, T, MT, mT, Mt and mt are the SI symbols for the tesla, megatesla, millitesla, megatonne (one teragram), and millitonne (one kilogram), respectively. If describing TNT equivalent units of energy, one megatonne of TNT is equivalent to approximately 4.184 petajoules.

Origin and spelling

In English, tonne is an established spelling alternative to metric ton. In the United States and United Kingdom, tonne is usually pronounced the same as ton, but the final "e" can also be pronounced, i.e. "tunnie". Both terms are acceptable in Canadian usage.

Ton and tonne are both derived from a Germanic word in general use in the North Sea area since the Middle Ages (cf. Old English and Old Frisian tunne, Old High German and Medieval Latin , German and French tonne) to designate a large cask, or tun. A full tun, standing about a metre high, could easily weigh a tonne.

The spelling tonne pre-dates the introduction of the SI in 1960; it has been used with this meaning in France since 1842, when there were no metric prefixes for multiples of 106 and above, and is now used as the standard spelling for the metric mass measurement in most English-speaking countries. In the United States, the unit was originally referred to using the French words millier or tonneau, but these terms are now obsolete. The Imperial and US customary units comparable to the tonne are both spelled ton in English, though they differ in mass.

Conversions
One tonne is equivalent to:
In kilograms:  by definition. 
In grams:  or 1 megagram (Mg). Megagram is the corresponding official SI unit with the same mass. Mg is distinct from mg, milligram.
In short tons: Exactly  short tons (ST), or approximately  ST.
One short ton is exactly .
In long tons: Exactly  long tons (LT), or approximately  LT.
One long ton is exactly .

A tonne is the mass of one cubic metre of pure water: at 4 °C one thousand litres of pure water has an absolute mass of one tonne.

Derived units
As a non-SI unit, the use of SI metric prefixes with the tonne does not fall within the SI standard.  For multiples of the tonne, it is more usual to speak of thousands or millions of tonnes. Kilotonne, megatonne, and gigatonne are more usually used for the energy of nuclear explosions and other events in equivalent mass of TNT, often loosely as approximate figures.  When used in this context, there is little need to distinguish between metric and other tons, and the unit is spelled either as ton or tonne with the relevant prefix attached.

*The equivalent units columns use the short scale large-number naming system currently used in most English-language countries, e.g. 1 billion = 1000 million = .
†Values in the equivalent short and long tons columns are rounded to five significant figures. See Conversions for exact values.
ǂThough non-standard, the symbol "kt" is also used (instead of the standard symbol "kn") for knot, a unit of speed for aircraft and sea-going vessels, and should not be confused with kilotonne.

Alternative usages

Metric ton units 
A metric ton unit (mtu) can mean 10 kg (approximately 22 lb) within metal trading, particularly within the United States. It traditionally referred to a metric ton of ore containing 1% (i.e. 10 kg) of metal.
The following excerpt from a mining geology textbook describes its usage in the particular case of tungsten:

In the case of uranium, MTU is sometimes used in the sense of metric ton of uranium (1,000 kg).

Use of mass as proxy for energy

The tonne of trinitrotoluene (TNT) is used as a proxy for energy, usually of explosions (TNT is a common high explosive). Prefixes are used: kiloton(ne), megaton(ne), gigaton(ne), especially for expressing nuclear weapon yield, based on a specific combustion energy of TNT of about 4.2 MJ/kg (or one thermochemical calorie per milligram).  Hence, 1 t TNT = approx. 4.2 GJ, 1 kt TNT = approx. 4.2 TJ, 1 Mt TNT = approx. 4.2 PJ.

The SI unit of energy is the joule. One tonne of TNT is approximately equivalent to 4.2 gigajoules.

In the petroleum industry the tonne of oil equivalent (toe) is a unit of energy: the amount of energy released by burning one tonne of crude oil, approx, 42 GJ.  There are several slightly different definitions.  This is ten times as much as a tonne of TNT because atmospheric oxygen is used.

Unit of force
Like the gram and the kilogram, the tonne gave rise to a (now obsolete) force unit of the same name, the tonne-force, equivalent to about 9.8 kilonewtons. The unit is also often called simply "tonne" or "metric ton" without identifying it as a unit of force.  In contrast to the tonne as a mass unit, the tonne-force is not accepted for use with SI.

See also
 Metre–tonne–second system of units
 Orders of magnitude (mass)
 Ton
 Tonnage
 Ton (volume)

Notes and references

External links 
NIST Special Publication 811, Guide for the Use of the International System of Units (SI)

Non-SI metric units
Units of mass